The Association of Norwegian Insurance Companies was an employers' organisation in Norway.

It was established in 1937, but in 2000 it was merged with the Norwegian Bankers' Association to form the Norwegian Financial Services Association. It was named  between 1937 and 1943, and 1945 to 1980.

References

Defunct employers' organisations in Norway
Organizations established in 1937
Organizations disestablished in 2000
1937 establishments in Norway